This page provides lists of best-selling individual books and book series to date and in any language. "Best-selling" refers to the estimated number of copies sold of each book, rather than the number of books printed or currently owned. Comics and textbooks are not included in this list. The books are listed according to the highest sales estimate as reported in reliable, independent sources. This list is incomplete because there are many books, such as The Count of Monte Cristo by Alexandre Dumas, Don Quixote by Miguel de Cervantes, and The Lord of the Rings (which has been sold as both a trilogy of books, The Fellowship of the Ring, The Two Towers, and Return of the King, and as a single issue) by J. R. R. Tolkien, that lack comprehensive sales figures.

According to Guinness World Records as of 1995, the Bible is the best-selling book of all time with an estimated 5billion copies sold and distributed. Sales estimates for other printed religious texts include at least  copies for the Qur'an and 190 million copies for the Book of Mormon. Among non-religious texts, the Quotations from Chairman Mao Tse-tung, also known as the Little Red Book, has produced a wide array of sales and distribution figures — with estimates ranging from 800million to over 6.5 billion printed volumes. Some claim the distribution ran into the "billions" and some cite "over a billion" official volumes between 1966 and 1969 alone as well as "untold numbers of unofficial local reprints and unofficial translations".  Exact print figures for these and other books may also be missing or unreliable since these kinds of books may be produced by many different and unrelated publishers, in some cases over many centuries. All books of a religious, ideological, philosophical or political nature have thus been excluded from the below lists of best-selling books for these reasons.

Having sold more than 600 million copies worldwide. Harry Potter by J. K. Rowling is the best-selling book series in history. The first novel in the series, Harry Potter and the Philosopher's Stone, has sold in excess of 120 million copies, making it one of the best-selling books of all time. As of June 2017, the series has been translated into 80 languages, placing Harry Potter among history's most translated literary works. The last four books in the series consecutively set records as the fastest-selling books of all time, where the final installment, Harry Potter and the Deathly Hallows, sold roughly fifteen million copies worldwide within twenty-four hours of its release. With twelve million books printed in the first US run, it also holds the record for the highest initial print run for any book in history.

Key

List of best-selling individual books

More than 100 million copies

Between 50 million and 100 million copies

Between 20 million and 50 million copies

Between 10 million and 20 million copies

List of best-selling book series

More than 100 million copies

Between 50 million and 100 million copies

Between 30 million and 50 million copies

Between 20 million and 30 million copies

Between 15 million and 20 million copies

Notes 

The Perry Rhodan series has sold more than 1 billion copies, but is not listed because that figure includes magazine sales, not novels alone.  Similarly, the Jerry Cotton series has sold over 300 million copies, but most of these were in magazine format.

The figures given for some books are for the number printed instead of confirmed sales.

List of best-selling regularly updated books

More than 100 million copies

Between 50 million and 100 million copies

Between 30 million and 50 million copies

Between 20 million and 30 million copies

Between 10 million and 20 million copies

See also 

 List of best-selling comic series
 List of best-selling manga
 List of best-selling fiction authors
 Publishers Weekly lists of bestselling novels in the United States
 List of literary works by number of translations
 Lists of books

References

External links 
 The Internet Public Library
 Frank Luther Mott Collection of American Best Sellers, 1662–1945  at the University of Missouri

Best-selling
Books
Literature records